German submarine U-516 was a Type IXC U-boat of Nazi Germany's Kriegsmarine during World War II.

She was laid down at the Deutsche Werft (yard) in Hamburg as yard number 312 on 12 May 1941, launched on 16 December 1941 and commissioned on 21 February 1942 with Korvettenkapitän Gerhard Wiebe in command.

U-516 began her service career with training as part of the 4th U-boat Flotilla from 10 March 1942. She was reassigned to the 10th flotilla for operations on 1 September 1942, then the 33rd flotilla on 1 October 1944.

She carried out six patrols, sank 16 ships and damaged one more. She surrendered on 14 May 1945 at Loch Eriboll in Scotland and was transferred to Lisahally in Northern Ireland for Operation Deadlight. She was sunk on 2 January 1946.

Design
German Type IXC submarines were slightly larger than the original Type IXBs. U-516 had a displacement of  when at the surface and  while submerged. She had two shafts and two  propellers.

U-516 was fitted with six  torpedo tubes (four fitted at the bow and two at the stern), 22 torpedoes, one  SK C/32 naval gun, 180 rounds, and a  SK C/30 as well as a  C/30 anti-aircraft gun. The boat had a complement of forty-eight.

Service history

First patrol
U-516es first patrol was preceded by a short trip from Kiel in Germany to Kristiansand in Norway. The patrol itself began with the boat's departure from Kristiansand on 15 August 1942. She passed through the 'gap' separating Iceland and the Faroe Islands before heading out into the Atlantic Ocean.

A small fire was started on the ship, but her accurate return fire discouraged the U-boat which broke off the attack. Port Jackson escaped at top speed into haze.

The boat moved to the waters off northern South America where her success rate shot-up, although one target required seven torpedoes to sink her.

She entered Lorient, on the French Atlantic coast, on 14 November.

Second and third patrols
For her second foray, U-516 headed toward South Africa. She sank three ships in the vicinity of East London and a fourth off the coast of southern Namibia.

Her third sortie was also in a southerly direction; its furthest point was reached between South America and the Cape Verde Islands.

Fourth patrol
Patrol number four took the boat to the Caribbean Sea. One of her victims was the Colombian sailing ship Ruby, which was sunk with the deck gun on 18 November 1943.

Another was the Elizabeth Kellog. This ship, which had been torpedoed and abandoned on the 23rd, ran around the survivors (she was still underway because the engines could not be secured). Her after magazine exploded and she burned for 12 hours before sinking.

The U-boat was damaged by an unidentified aircraft on 19 December 1943.

Fifth patrol
She then made her way to Flensburg via the Denmark Strait that separates Greenland and Iceland. She docked at the German harbour on 4 October 1944.

Sixth patrol and fate
Having moved from Kiel to Horten Naval Base, (south of Oslo) and then Kristiansand, she left the Norwegian port on 5 April 1945. She surrendered at Loch Eriboll on 14 May and was then transferred to Lisahally in Northern Ireland for Operation Deadlight.

Summary of raiding history

References

Bibliography

External links

German Type IX submarines
U-boats commissioned in 1942
U-boats sunk in 1946
World War II submarines of Germany
1941 ships
World War II shipwrecks in the Atlantic Ocean
Ships built in Hamburg
Operation Deadlight
Maritime incidents in 1946